The 4th Biathlon World Championships were held in 1962 in Hämeenlinna, Finland. The men's 20 km individual and team were the only competitions.

Men's results

20 km individual

Each shot missing the target gave a penalty of 2 minutes.

20 km team

The times of the top 3 athletes from each nation in the individual race were added together.

Medal table

References

1962
Biathlon World Championships
International sports competitions hosted by Finland
1962 in Finnish sport
March 1962 sports events in Europe
Biathlon competitions in Finland
Sport in Hämeenlinna